John Joseph "JJ" Melligan (born 11 February 1982 in Whitehall, Dublin) is an Irish footballer who plays for Hinckley AFC.

Career
Melligan first began playing for the Home Farm Club in Dublin before signing for Wolverhampton Wanderers in 1998. In 2001–02, Melligan went on loan to AFC Bournemouth and again at Kidderminster Harriers in 2002–03. After scoring 12 goals in 31 appearances he returned to Wolves and made two substitute appearances in (the then) Division One.

In 2003, he made a substitute appearance for the Republic of Ireland Under-21 team and went on to make 21 appearances on-loan at Doncaster Rovers in the 2003–04 season.

At the end of that season Melligan, signed for Cheltenham Town from Wolves for £25,000. He went on to miss just three league games for Cheltenham over the next three years as he became an important part of their side.

On 6 June 2007, Melligan signed for Leyton Orient on a free transfer, and scored in only his second appearance for them. He left Leyton Orient in February 2010 after falling out with manager Geraint Williams following the 5–0 victory over Bristol Rovers. He signed a full-time contract for League of Ireland Premier side Dundalk in February 2010. Melligan left Dundalk just before they set off to play Grevenmacher, from Luxembourg, in the UEFA Europa League. In his short stint with Dundalk he scored three goals in fifteen appearances.

On 2 July 2010, Melligan re-signed for his former club, Cheltenham Town. Melligan had a clause in his contract allowing him to leave Dundalk if a Football League club came in for him so he was allowed to leave Dundalk for free. On 9 May 2011, Melligan was released from Cheltenham after his contract expired.

Melligan signed for Conference North side Solihull Moors in October 2011 after a successful trial. He scored on debut in the 3-2 FA Cup victory over Grantham on 15 October 2011.

Following a spell at Wolverhampton Casuals, Melligan followed manager Carl Abbott to newly formed club Hinckley AFC in the summer of 2014, where he was made club captain.

References

External links

1982 births
Living people
Association footballers from County Dublin
Republic of Ireland association footballers
Republic of Ireland under-21 international footballers
Wolverhampton Wanderers F.C. players
AFC Bournemouth players
Kidderminster Harriers F.C. players
Doncaster Rovers F.C. players
Cheltenham Town F.C. players
Leyton Orient F.C. players
Dundalk F.C. players
English Football League players
League of Ireland players
Solihull Moors F.C. players
Hinckley A.F.C. players
Home Farm F.C. players
Wolverhampton Casuals F.C. players
Association football midfielders